Jabalpur Airport , also known as Dumna Airport, is a domestic airport serving the city of Jabalpur, Madhya Pradesh, India. It is the third busiest airport in Madhya Pradesh after Devi Ahilya Bai Holkar International Airport in Indore and Raja Bhoj Airport in Bhopal in terms of both passenger and aircraft movements. The Airports Authority of India (AAI) is upgrading the airport to provide better services to the air travellers of the region. The upgrades are expected to be completed by the end of 2023, and the new terminal building is to be commissioned by March 2023.

The airport serves the whole of eastern Madhya Pradesh, especially the Mahakaushal region. It serves tourists who visit Kanha National Park and Bandhavgarh National Park and the marble cliffs and waterfalls on either sides of the Narmada River, at nearby Bhedaghat amongst other areas and attractions. Alliance Air, IndiGo and SpiceJet operate scheduled flight services to and from Jabalpur Airport.

History
The airport was constructed during the British era. The airport was opened in the 1930s and used periodically by the Royal Air Force and Royal Flying Corps before and during World War II.  It was commonly known as Jubbulpore Aerodrome, and had a dirt runway until the 1960s.  The new paved runway was built atop the original dirt runway, in the same alignment.  Before the aerodrome at Dumna was opened, planes had been landing, even in the 1920s, within a racecourse inside the city limits of Jabalpur.
In 2015, the State government handed over 468.43 acres of land to the AAI for expansion of the airport.

Facilities

Communication, navigation and surveillance 
Airport has CNS/ATM facility like VHF, ATIS, DVR, AFTN, DVOR/DME, ADS-B, RCAG. ILS and Automation is going to be installed after completion of RWY expansion. Airport have also airport system and security facilities for APSUs like CCTV, X-ray machines, ETD, FIDS, PA SYSTEMS, DFMD, HHMD. The facilities are installed, operated, managed by CNS team of AAI.

Runway 
The runway is capable of serving narrow body aircraft including Airbus 320 family/Boeing 737-800 and is equipped with night landing facilities, DVOR/DME, NDB and precision approach path indicator. It has a parking for one A-320/B-737 or 2 ATR-72 aircraft. ILS is under process after completion of RWY expansion, by CNS team and ADS-B and RCAG is going to commissioned soon.

Terminal
The terminal has the capacity of handling 200 passengers at the peak hours. It has 4 check-in desks apart from CCTV's and an X-ray machine for security. The airport is equipped with runway lighting, car-calling, night landing facilities, a food stall and an ATM. The Government of Madhya Pradesh had provided with Tourism Information Center and medical facilities like first-aid, MIR, and doctors and nurse will be provided soon.

Airlines and destinations

Statistics

Expansion
A new terminal building, spread over an area of 115,180 sq.ft. (10,701 m2), with a capacity to handle 500 passengers during peak hours is under-construction. The terminal will have three aerobridges, an advanced baggage screening system and a car parking for more than 250 cars and buses. The building is to be commissioned by March 2023.
These upgrades were expected to be completed by December 2021, but due to the COVID-19 pandemic, which faced delays in work, it is now expected to be finished by the end of 2023.
The foundation stone was laid on August 13, 2018, by Suresh Prabhu, Jayant Sinha, Rakesh Singh amongst others.

Accidents and incidents
On 4 December 2015, a Spicejet Bombardier Dash 8 Q400 registration VT-SUC, operating as Spicejet Flight 2458, was landing at Jabalpur when the aircraft collided with a herd of 30-40 wild boars. Three boars were killed and the aircraft skidded off the runway coming to a stop with the left gear collapsed, left engine damage, and other unknown damage caused by the impact. Despite the damage, no serious passenger injuries were reported
On 12 March 2022, an Alliance Air ATR-72-600 with the registration VT-AIW operating Alliance Air flight 617, was landing on runway 06 when it overshot the runway and came to rest on the RESA. All 55 passengers and 5 crew were evacuated from the aircraft unharmed.

References

External links

Airports in Madhya Pradesh
Transport in Jabalpur
1930s establishments in India
Airports established in the 1930s
20th-century architecture in India